Plaza is an unincorporated community in Spokane County, Washington, United States. U.S. Route 195, a major north–south highway in the Palouse region, ran through the settlement until it was relocated to a bypass in 1974. The highway now passes a couple hundred feet west of the settlement. There are no services in Plaza, and the community itself is only a few square blocks in size, but the grain elevators in town make it a landmark for drivers on the highway.

History 
Plaza was founded by Robert Patterson, a former Pony Express rider who had operated throughout Washington Territory. He built a general store along the rail line that ran between Spokane and Colfax, and a small community of farmers and tradesmen cropped up around it. Agriculture was the primary industry, but goods and services were also made available to railway passengers.

References

Unincorporated communities in Spokane County, Washington
Unincorporated communities in Washington (state)